Pelophila rudis is a species of black coloured ground beetle in Nebriinae subfamily which was described by John Lawrence LeConte in 1863. The species can be found in Canada and Arkansas, United States.

References

Beetles described in 1863
Beetles of North America